Language revitalization, also referred to as language revival or reversing language shift, is an attempt to halt or reverse the decline of a language or to revive an extinct one. Those involved can include linguists, cultural or community groups, or governments. Some argue for a distinction between language revival (the resurrection of an extinct language with no existing native speakers) and language revitalization (the rescue of a "dying" language). There has only been one successful instance of a complete language revival, the Hebrew language, creating a new generation of native speakers without any pre-existing native speakers as a model.

Languages targeted for language revitalization include those whose use and prominence is severely limited. Sometimes various tactics of language revitalization can even be used to try to revive extinct languages. Though the goals of language revitalization vary greatly from case to case, they typically involve attempting to expand the number of speakers and use of a language, or trying to maintain the current level of use to protect the language from extinction or language death.

Reasons for revitalization vary: they can include physical danger affecting those whose language is dying, economic danger such as the exploitation of indigenous natural resources, political danger such as genocide, or cultural danger/assimilation. In recent times alone, it is estimated that more than 2000 languages have already become extinct. The UN estimates that more than half of the languages spoken today have fewer than 10,000 speakers and that a quarter have fewer than 1,000 speakers; and that, unless there are some efforts to maintain them, over the next hundred years most of these will become extinct. These figures are often cited as reasons why language revitalization is necessary to preserve linguistic diversity. Culture and identity are also frequently cited reasons for language revitalization, when a language is perceived as a unique "cultural treasure". A community often sees language as a unique part of their culture, connecting them with their ancestors or with the land, making up an essential part of their history and self-image.

Language revitalization is also closely tied to the linguistic field of language documentation. In this field, linguists try to create a complete record of a language's grammar, vocabulary, and linguistic features. This practice can often lead to more concern for the revitalization of a specific language on study. Furthermore, the task of documentation is often taken on with the goal of revitalization in mind.

Degrees of language endangerment

Five point scale 
One possible five-point scale is as follows:
 Healthy/strong: all generations use language in variety of settings
 Weakening/sick: spoken by older people; not fully used by younger generations
 Moribund/dying: only a few adult speakers remain; no longer used as native language by children
 Dead: no longer spoken as a native language
 Extinct: no longer spoken and has few or no written records

Another scale 
Another scale for identifying degrees of language endangerment is used in a 2003 paper ("Language Vitality and Endangerment") commissioned by UNESCO from an international group of linguists. The linguists, among other goals and priorities, create a scale with six degrees for language vitality and endangerment. They also propose nine factors or criteria (six of which use the six-degree scale) to "characterize a language’s overall sociolinguistic situation". The nine factors with their respective scales are:

 Intergenerational language transmission
 safe: all generations use the language
 unsafe: some children use the language in all settings, all children use the language in some settings
 definitively endangered: few children speak the language; predominantly spoken by the parental generation and older
 severely endangered: spoken by older generations; not used by the parental generation and younger
 critically endangered: few speakers remain and are mainly from the great grandparental generation
 extinct: no living speakers
 Absolute number of speakers
 Proportion of speakers within the total population
 safe: the language is spoken by 100% of the population
 unsafe: the language is spoken by nearly 100% of the population
 definitively endangered: the language is spoken by a majority of the population
 severely endangered: the language is spoken by less than 50% of the population
 critically endangered: the language has very few speakers
 extinct: no living speakers
 Trends in existing language domains
 universal use (safe): spoken in all domains; for all functions
 multilingual parity (unsafe): multiple languages (2+) are spoken in most social domains; for most functions
 dwindling domains (definitively endangered): mainly spoken in home domains and is in competition with the dominant language; for many functions
 limited or formal domains (severely endangered): spoken in limited social domains; for several functions
 highly limited domains (critically endangered): spoken in highly restricted domains; for minimal functions
 extinct: no domains; no functions
 Response to new domains and media
 dynamic (safe): spoken in all new domains
 robust/active (unsafe): spoken in most new domains
 receptive (definitively endangered): spoken in many new domains
 coping (severely endangered): spoken in some new domains
 minimal (critically endangered): spoken in minimal new domains
 inactive (extinct): spoken in no new domains
 Materials for language education and literacy
 safe: established orthography and extensive access to educational materials
 unsafe: access to educational materials; children developing literacy; not used by administration
 definitively endangered: access to educational materials exist at school; literacy in language is not promoted
 severely endangered: literacy materials exist however are not present in school curriculum
 critically endangered: orthography is known and some written materials exist
 extinct: no orthography is known
 Governmental and institutional language attitudes and policies (including official status and use)
 equal support (safe): all languages are equally protected
 differentiated support (unsafe): primarily protected for private domains
 passive assimilation (definitively endangered): no explicit protective policy; language use dwindles in public domain
 active assimilation (severely endangered): government discourages use of language; no governmental protection of language in any domain
 forced assimilation (critically endangered): language is not recognized or protected; government recognized another official language
 prohibition (extinct): use of language is banned
 Community members' attitudes towards their own language
 safe: language is revered, valued, and promoted by whole community
 unsafe: language maintenance is supported by most of the community
 definitively endangered: language maintenance is supported by much of the community; the rest are indifferent or support language loss
 severely endangered: language maintenance is supported by some of the community; the rest are indifferent or support language loss
 critically endangered: language maintenance is supported by only a few members of the community; the rest are indifferent or support language loss
 extinct: complete apathy towards language maintenance; prefer dominant language
 Amount and quality of documentation.
 superlative (safe): extensive audio, video, media, and written documentation of the language
 good (unsafe): audio, video, media, and written documentation all exist; a handful of each
 fair (definitively endangered): some audio and video documentation exists; adequate written documentation
 fragmentary (severely endangered): minimal audio and video documentation exists at low quality; minimal written documentation
 inadequate (critically endangered): only a handful of written documentation exists
 undocumented (extinct): no documentation exists

Theory 
One of the most important preliminary steps in language revitalization/recovering involves establishing the degree to which a particular language has been “dislocated”. This helps involved parties find the best way to assist or revive the language.

Steps in reversing language shift 
There are many different theories or models that attempt to lay out a plan for language revitalization. One of these is provided by celebrated linguist Joshua Fishman.
Fishman's model for reviving threatened (or sleeping) languages, or for making them sustainable, consists of an eight-stage process. Efforts should be concentrated on the earlier stages of restoration until they have been consolidated before proceeding to the later stages. The eight stages are:

Acquisition of the language by adults, who in effect act as language apprentices (recommended where most of the remaining speakers of the language are elderly and socially isolated from other speakers of the language).
Create a socially integrated population of active speakers (or users) of the language (at this stage it is usually best to concentrate mainly on the spoken language rather than the written language).
In localities where there are a reasonable number of people habitually using the language, encourage the informal use of the language among people of all age groups and within families and bolster its daily use through the establishment of local neighbourhood institutions in which the language is encouraged, protected and (in certain contexts at least) used exclusively.
In areas where oral competence in the language has been achieved in all age groups, encourage literacy in the language, but in a way that does not depend upon assistance from (or goodwill of) the state education system.
Where the state permits it, and where numbers warrant, encourage the use of the language in compulsory state education.
Where the above stages have been achieved and consolidated, encourage the use of the language in the workplace.
Where the above stages have been achieved and consolidated, encourage the use of the language in local government services and mass media.
Where the above stages have been achieved and consolidated, encourage use of the language in higher education, government, etc.

This model of language revival is intended to direct efforts to where they are most effective and to avoid wasting energy trying to achieve the later stages of recovery when the earlier stages have not been achieved. For instance, it is probably wasteful to campaign for the use of a language on television or in government services if hardly any families are in the habit of using the language.

Additionally, Tasaku Tsunoda describes a range of different techniques or methods that speakers can use to try to revitalize a language, including techniques to revive extinct languages and maintain weak ones. The techniques he lists are often limited to the current vitality of the language.

He claims that the immersion method cannot be used to revitalize an extinct or moribund language. In contrast, the master-apprentice method of one-on-one transmission on language proficiency can be used with moribund languages. Several other methods of revitalization, including those that rely on technology such as recordings or media, can be used for languages in any state of viability.

Factors in successful language revitalization 
David Crystal, in his book Language Death, proposes that language revitalization is more likely to be successful if its speakers
 increase the language's prestige within the dominant community;
 increase their wealth and income;
 increase their legitimate power in the eyes of the dominant community;
 have a strong presence in the education system;
 can write down the language;
 can use electronic technology.

In her book, Endangered Languages: An Introduction, Sarah Thomason notes the success of revival efforts for modern Hebrew and the relative success of revitalizing Maori in New Zealand (see Specific Examples below). One notable factor these two examples share is that the children were raised in fully immersive environments. In the case of Hebrew, it was on early collective-communities called kibbutzim. For the Maori language In New Zealand, this was done through a language nest.

Revival linguistics 
Ghil'ad Zuckermann proposes "Revival Linguistics" as a new linguistic discipline and paradigm.

According to Zuckermann, "revival linguistics combines scientific studies of native language acquisition and foreign language learning. After all, language reclamation is the most extreme case of second-language learning. Revival linguistics complements the established area of documentary linguistics, which records endangered languages before they fall asleep."

Zuckermann proposes that "revival linguistics changes the field of historical linguistics by, for instance, weakening the family tree model, which implies that a language has only one parent."

There are disagreements in the field of language revitalization as to the degree that revival should concentrate on maintaining the traditional language, versus allowing simplification or widespread borrowing from the majority language.

Compromise 
Zuckermann acknowledges the presence of "local peculiarities and idiosyncrasies" but suggests that "there are linguistic constraints applicable to all revival attempts. Mastering them would help revivalists and first nations' leaders to work more efficiently. For example, it is easier to resurrect basic vocabulary and verbal conjugations than sounds and word order. Revivalists should be realistic and abandon discouraging, counter-productive slogans such as "Give us authenticity or give us death!" Nancy Dorian has pointed out that conservative attitudes toward loanwords and grammatical changes often hamper efforts to revitalize endangered languages (as with Tiwi in Australia), and that a division can exist between educated revitalizers, interested in historicity, and remaining speakers interested in locally authentic idiom (as has sometimes occurred with Irish). Some have argued that structural compromise may, in fact, enhance the prospects of survival, as may have been the case with English in the post-Norman period.

Traditionalist 
Other linguists have argued that when language revitalization borrows heavily from the majority language, the result is a new language, perhaps a creole or pidgin. For example, the existence of "Neo-Hawaiian" as a separate language from "Traditional Hawaiian" has been proposed, due to the heavy influence of English on every aspect of the revived Hawaiian language. This has also been proposed for Irish, with a sharp division between "Urban Irish" (spoken by second-language speakers) and traditional Irish (as spoken as a first language in Gaeltacht areas). Ó Béarra stated: "[to] follow the syntax and idiomatic conventions of English, [would be] producing what amounts to little more than English in Irish drag." With regard to the then-moribund Manx language, the scholar T. F. O'Rahilly stated, "When a language surrenders itself to foreign idiom, and when all its speakers become bilingual, the penalty is death." Neil McRae has stated that the uses of Scottish Gaelic are becoming increasingly tokenistic, and native Gaelic idiom is being lost in favor of artificial terms created by second-language speakers.

Specific examples 
The total revival of a dead language (in the sense of having no native speakers) to become the shared means of communication of a self-sustaining community of several million first language speakers has happened only once, in the case of Hebrew, now the national language of Israel. In this case, there was a unique set of historical and cultural characteristics that facilitated the revival. (See Revival of the Hebrew language.) Hebrew, once largely a liturgical language, was re-established as a means of everyday communication by Jews migrating to what is now the State of Israel and the Palestinian territories, starting in the nineteenth century. It is the world's most famous and successful example of language revitalization.

In a related development, literary languages without native speakers enjoyed great prestige and practical utility as lingua francas, often counting millions of fluent speakers at a time. In many such cases, a decline in the use of the literary language, sometimes precipitous, was later accompanied by a strong renewal. This happened, for example, in the revival of Classical Latin in the Renaissance, and the revival of Sanskrit in the early centuries AD. An analogous phenomenon in contemporary Arabic-speaking areas is the expanded use of the literary language (Modern Standard Arabic, a form of the Classical Arabic of the 6th century AD). This is taught to all educated speakers and is used in radio broadcasts, formal discussions, etc.

In addition, literary languages have sometimes risen to the level of becoming first languages of very large language communities. An example is standard Italian, which originated as a literary language based on the language of 13th-century Florence, especially as used by such important Florentine writers as Dante, Petrarch and Boccaccio. The subsequent success of the language has been through conscious development, where speakers of any of the numerous Italian languages were taught standard Italian as a second language and subsequently imparted it to their children, who learned it as a first language. Of course this came at the expense of local Italian languages, most of which are now endangered. Success was enjoyed in similar circumstances by High German, standard Czech, Castilian Spanish and other languages.

Africa 
The Coptic language began its decline when Arabic became the predominant language in Egypt. Pope Shenouda III established the Coptic Language Institute in December 1976 in Saint Mark's Coptic Orthodox Cathedral in Cairo for the purpose of reviving the Coptic language.

Americas

North America 
In recent years, a growing number of Native American tribes have been trying to revitalize their languages. For example, there are apps (including phrases, word lists and dictionaries) in many Native languages including Cree, Cherokee, Chickasaw, Lakota, Ojibwe, Oneida, Massachusett, Navajo, Halq'emeylem, Gwych'in, and Lushootseed.

Wampanoag, a language spoken by the people of the same name in Massachusetts, underwent a language revival project led by Jessie Little Doe Baird, a trained linguist. Members of the tribe use the extensive written records that exist in their language, including a translation of the Bible and legal documents, in order to learn and teach Wampanoag. The project has seen children speaking the language fluently for the first time in over 100 years. In addition, there are currently attempts at reviving the Chochenyo language of California, which had become extinct.

Tlingit 
Similar to other Indigenous languages, Tlingit is critically endangered. Less than 100 fluent Elders continue to exist. From 2013 to 2014, the language activist, author, and teacher, Sʔímlaʔxw Michele K. Johnson from the Syilx Nation, attempted to teach two hopeful learners of Tlingit in the Yukon. Her methods included textbook creation, sequenced immersion curriculum, and film assessment. The aim was to assist in the creation of adult speakers that are of parent-age, so that they too can begin teaching the language. In 2020, X̱ʼunei Lance Twitchell led an Tlingit online class with Outer Coast College. Dozens of students participated. He is an associate professor of Alaska Native Languages in the School of Arts and Sciences at the University of Alaska Southeast which offers a minor in Tlingit language and an emphasis on Alaska Native Languages and Studies within a Bachelorʼs degree in Liberal Arts.

South America 
Kichwa is the variety of the Quechua language spoken in Ecuador and is one of the most widely spoken indigenous languages in South America. Despite this fact, Kichwa is a threatened language, mainly because of the expansion of Spanish in South America. One community of original Kichwa speakers, Lagunas, was one of the first indigenous communities to switch to the Spanish language. According to King, this was because of the increase of trade and business with the large Spanish-speaking town nearby. The Lagunas people assert that it was not for cultural assimilation purposes, as they value their cultural identity highly. However, once this contact was made, language for the Lagunas people shifted through generations, to Kichwa and Spanish bilingualism and now is essentially Spanish monolingualism. The feelings of the Lagunas people present a dichotomy with language use, as most of the Lagunas members speak Spanish exclusively and only know a few words in Kichwa.

The prospects for Kichwa language revitalization are not promising, as parents depend on schooling for this purpose, which is not nearly as effective as continual language exposure in the home. Schooling in the Lagunas community, although having a conscious focus on teaching Kichwa, consists of mainly passive interaction, reading, and writing in Kichwa. In addition to grassroots efforts, national language revitalization organizations, like CONAIE, focus attention on non-Spanish speaking indigenous children, who represent a large minority in the country. Another national initiative, Bilingual Intercultural Education Project (PEBI), was ineffective in language revitalization because instruction was given in Kichwa and Spanish was taught as a second language to children who were almost exclusively Spanish monolinguals.
Although some techniques seem ineffective, Kendall A. King provides several suggestions:

 Exposure to and acquisition of the language at a young age.
 
 Extreme immersion techniques.
 
 Multiple and diverse efforts to reach adults.
 
 Flexibility and coordination in planning and implementation
 
 Directly addressing different varieties of the language.
 
 Planners stressing that language revitalization is a long process
 
 Involving as many people as possible
 
 Parents using the language with their children
 
 Planners and advocates approaching the problem from all directions.

Specific suggestions include imparting an elevated perception of the language in schools, focusing on grassroots efforts both in school and the home, and maintaining national and regional attention.

Asia

Hebrew 

The revival of the Hebrew language is
the only truly successful example of a revived dead language. The Hebrew language survived into the medieval period as the language of Jewish liturgy and rabbinic literature. With the rise of Zionism in the 19th century, it was revived as a spoken and literary language, becoming primarily a spoken lingua franca among the early Jewish immigrants to Ottoman Palestine and received the official status in the 1922 constitution of the British Mandate for Palestine and subsequently of the State of Israel.

Sanskrit 

The revival of Sanskrit happened in India. In the 2001 census of India, 14,135 people claimed Sanskrit as their mother tongue. It increased to 24,821 people in the 2011 census of India. Sanskrit has experienced a recorded growth of over 70 per cent in one decade due to the Sanskrit revival. Many Sanskrit speaking villages were also developed. However, Sanskrit speakers still account for just 0.00198 percent of India's total population.

Soyot 

The Soyot language of the small-numbered Soyots in Buryatia, Russia, one of Siberian Turkic languages, has been reconstructed and a Soyot-Buryat-Russian dictionary has been published in 2002. The language is currently taught in some elementary schools.

Ainu 

The Ainu language of the indigenous Ainu people of northern Japan is currently moribund, but efforts are underway to revive it. A 2006 survey of the Hokkaido Ainu indicated that only 4.6% of Ainu surveyed were able to converse in or "speak a little" Ainu. As of 2001, Ainu was not taught in any elementary or secondary schools in Japan, but was offered at numerous language centres and universities in Hokkaido, as well as at Tokyo's Chiba University.

Manchu 

In China, the Manchu language is one of the most endangered languages, with speakers only in three small areas of Manchuria remaining. Some enthusiasts are trying to revive the language of their ancestors using available dictionaries and textbooks, and even occasional visits to Qapqal Xibe Autonomous County in Xinjiang, where the related Xibe language is still spoken natively.

Spanish 

In the Philippines, a local variety of Spanish that was primarily based on Mexican Spanish was the lingua franca of the country since Spanish colonization in 1565 and was an official language alongside Filipino (standardized Tagalog) and English until 1987, following a ratification of a new constitution, where it was re-designated as a voluntary language. As a result of its loss as an official language and years of marginalization at the official level during and after American colonization, the use of Spanish amongst the overall populace decreased dramatically and became moribund, with the remaining native speakers left being mostly elderly people. The language has seen a gradual revival, however, due to official promotion under the administration of former President Gloria Macapagal Arroyo. Most notably, Resolution No. 2006-028 reinstated Spanish as a mandatory subject in secondary schools and universities. Results were immediate as the job demand for Spanish speakers had increased since 2008. As of 2010, the Instituto Cervantes in Manila reported the number of Spanish-speakers in the country with native or non-native knowledge at approximately 3 million, the figure albeit including those who speak the Spanish-based creole Chavacano. Complementing government efforts is a notable surge of exposure through the mainstream media and, more recently, music-streaming services.

Other Asian 
The Kodrah Kristang revitalization initiative in Singapore seeks to revive the critically endangered Kristang creole.

In Thailand, there exists a Chong language revitalization project, headed by Suwilai Premsrirat.

Europe 
In Europe, in the 19th and early 20th centuries, the use of both local and learned languages declined as the central governments of the different states imposed their vernacular language as the standard throughout education and official use (this was the case in the United Kingdom, France, Spain, Italy and Greece, and to some extent, in Germany and Austria-Hungary).

In the last few decades, local nationalism and human rights movements have made a more multicultural policy standard in European states; sharp condemnation of the earlier practices of suppressing regional languages was expressed in the use of such terms as "linguicide".

Irish 

One of the best known European attempts at language revitalization concerns the Irish language. While English is dominant through most of Ireland, Irish, a Celtic language, is still spoken in certain areas called Gaeltachtaí, but there it is in serious decline. The challenges faced by the language over the last few centuries have included exclusion from important domains, social denigration, the death or emigration of many Irish speakers during the Irish famine of the 1840s, and continued emigration since. Efforts to revitalise Irish were being made, however, from the mid-1800s, and were associated with a desire for Irish political independence. Contemporary Irish language revitalization has chiefly involved teaching Irish as a compulsory language in mainstream English-speaking schools. But the failure to teach it in an effective and engaging way means (as linguist Andrew Carnie notes) that students do not acquire the fluency needed for the lasting viability of the language, and this leads to boredom and resentment. Carnie also noted a lack of media in Irish (2006), though this is no longer the case.

The decline of the Gaeltachtaí and the failure of state-directed revitalisation have been countered by an urban revival movement. This is largely based on an independent community-based school system, known generally as Gaelscoileanna. These schools teach entirely through Irish and their number is growing, with over thirty such schools in Dublin alone. They are an important element in the creation of a network of urban Irish speakers (known as Gaeilgeoirí), who tend to be young, well-educated and middle-class. It is now likely that this group has acquired critical mass, a fact reflected in the expansion of Irish-language media. Irish language television has enjoyed particular success. It has been argued that they tend to be better educated than monolingual English speakers and enjoy higher social status. They represent the transition of Irish to a modern urban world, with an accompanying rise in prestige.

Scottish Gaelic 
There are also current attempts to revive the related language of Scottish Gaelic, which was suppressed following the formation of the United Kingdom, and entered further decline due to the Highland clearances. Currently, Gaelic is only spoken widely in the Western Isles and some relatively small areas of the Highlands and Islands. The decline in fluent Gaelic speakers has slowed; however, the population center has shifted to L2 speakers in urban areas, especially Glasgow.

Manx 

Another Celtic language, Manx, lost its last native speaker in 1974 and was declared extinct by UNESCO in 2009, but never completely fell from use. The language is now taught in primary and secondary schools, including as a teaching medium at the Bunscoill Ghaelgagh, used in some public events and spoken as a second language by approximately 1800 people. Revitalization efforts include radio shows in Manx Gaelic and social media and online resources. The Manx government has also been involved in the effort by creating organizations such as the Manx Heritage Foundation (Culture Vannin) and the position of Manx Language Officer. The government has released an official Manx Language Strategy for 2017–2021.

Cornish 
There have been a number of attempts to revive the Cornish language, both privately and some under the Cornish Language Partnership. Some of the activities have included translation of the Christian scriptures, a guild of bards, and the promotion of Cornish literature in modern Cornish, including novels and poetry.

Caló 
The Romani arriving in the Iberian Peninsula developed an Iberian Romani dialect.
As time passed, Romani ceased to be a full language and became Caló, a cant mixing Iberian Romance grammar and Romani vocabulary.
With sedentarization and obligatory instruction in the official languages, Caló is used less and less.
As Iberian Romani proper is extinct and as Caló is endangered, some people are trying to revitalise the language. The Spanish politician Juan de Dios Ramírez Heredia promotes Romanò-Kalò, a variant of International Romani, enriched by Caló words. His goal is to reunify the Caló and Romani roots.

Livonian 

The Livonian language, a Finnic language, once spoken on about a third of modern-day Latvian territory, died in the 21st century with the death of the last native speaker Grizelda Kristiņa on 2 June 2013. Today there are about 210 people mainly living in Latvia who identify themselves as Livonian and speak the language on the A1-A2 level according to the Common European Framework of Reference for Languages and between 20 and 40 people who speak the language on level B1 and up. Today all speakers learn Livonian as a second language. There are different programs educating Latvians on the cultural and linguistic heritage of Livonians and the fact that most Latvians have common Livonian descent.

Programs worth mentioning include:

 Livones.net with extensive information about language, history and culture
 The Livonian Institute of the University of Latvia doing research on the Livonian language, other Finnic languages in Latvia and providing an extensive Livonian-Latvian-Estonian dictionary with declinations/conjugations
 Virtual Livonia providing information on the Livonian language and especially its grammar
 Mierlinkizt: An annual summer camp for children to teach children about the Livonian language, culture etc.
 Līvõd Īt (Livonian Union)

The Livonian linguistic and cultural heritage is included in the Latvian cultural canon and the protection, revitalization and development of Livonian as an indigenous language is guaranteed by Latvian law

Old Prussian 

A few linguists and philologists are involved in reviving a reconstructed form of the extinct Old Prussian language from Luther's catechisms, the Elbing Vocabulary, place names, and Prussian loanwords in the Low Prussian dialect of German. Several dozen people use the language in Lithuania, Kaliningrad, and Poland, including a few children who are natively bilingual.

The Prusaspirā Society has published their translation of Antoine de Saint-Exupéry's The Little Prince. The book was translated by Piotr Szatkowski (Pīteris Šātkis) and released in 2015. The other efforts of Baltic Prussian societies include the development of online dictionaries, learning apps and games. There also have been several attempts to produce music with lyrics written in the revived Baltic Prussian language, most notably in the Kaliningrad Oblast by Romowe Rikoito, Kellan and Āustras Laīwan, but also in Lithuania by Kūlgrinda in their 2005 album Prūsų Giesmės (Prussian Hymns), and in Latvia by Rasa Ensemble in 1988 and Valdis Muktupāvels in his 2005 oratorio "Pārcēlātājs Pontifex" featuring several parts sung in Prussian.

Important in this revival was Vytautas Mažiulis, who died on 11 April 2009, and his pupil Letas Palmaitis, leader of the experiment and author of the website Prussian Reconstructions. Two late contributors were Prāncis Arellis (Pranciškus Erelis), Lithuania, and Dailūns Russinis (Dailonis Rusiņš), Latvia. After them, Twankstas Glabbis from Kaliningrad oblast and Nērtiks Pamedīns from East-Prussia, now Polish Warmia-Mazuria actively joined.

Yola 
The Yola language revival movement has cultivated in Wexford in recent years, and the “Gabble Ing Yola” resource center for Yola materials claims there are around 140 speakers of the Yola language today.

Oceania

Australia 
The European colonization of Australia, and the consequent damage sustained by Aboriginal communities, had a catastrophic effect on indigenous languages, especially in the southeast and south of the country, leaving some with no living traditional native speakers. A number of Aboriginal communities in Victoria and elsewhere are now trying to revive some of these languages. The work is typically directed by a group of Aboriginal elders and other knowledgeable people, with community language workers doing most of the research and teaching. They analyze the data, develop spelling systems and vocabulary and prepare resources. Decisions are made in collaboration. Some communities employ linguists, and there are also linguists who have worked independently, such as Luise Hercus and Peter K. Austin.
 In the state of Queensland, an effort is being made to teach some Indigenous languages in schools and to develop workshops for adults. More than 150 languages were once spoken within the state, but today fewer than 20 are spoken as a first language, and less than two per cent of schools teach any Indigenous language. The Gunggari language is one language which is being revived, with only three native speakers left.
 In the Northern Territory, the Pertame Project is an example in Central Australia. Pertame, from the country south of Alice Springs, along the Finke River, is a dialect in the Arrernte group of languages. With only 20 fluent speakers left by 2018, the Pertame Project is seeking to retain and revive the language, headed by Pertame elder Christobel Swan.
 In the far north of South Australia, the Diyari language has an active programme under way, with materials available for teaching in schools and the wider community.
 The Victorian Department of Education and Training reported 1,867 student enrollments in 14 schools offering an Aboriginal Languages Program in the state of Victoria in 2018.

New Zealand 

It is the ancestral tongue of the indigenous Maori people of New Zealand and a vehicle for prose narrative, sung poetry, and genealogical recital. The history of the Maori people is taught in Maori in sacred learning houses through oral transmission. Even after Maori became a written language, the oral tradition was preserved.

Once European colonization began, many laws were enacted in order to promote the use of English over Maori among indigenous people. The Education Ordinance Act of 1847 mandated school instruction in English and established boarding schools to speed up assimilation of Maori youths into European culture. The Native School Act of 1858 forbade Māori from being spoken in schools.

During the 1970s, a group of young Maori people, the Ngā Tamatoa, successfully campaigned for Maori to be taught in schools. Also, Kōhanga Reo, Māori language preschools, called language nests, were established. The emphasis was on teaching children the language at a young age, a very effective strategy for language learning. The Maori Language Commission was formed in 1987, leading to a number of national reforms aimed at revitalizing Maori. They include media programmes broadcast in Maori, undergraduate college programmes taught in Maori, and an annual Maori language week. Each iwi (tribe) created a language planning programme catering to its specific circumstances. These efforts have resulted in a steady increase in children being taught in Maori in schools since 1996.

Hawaiian 

On six of the seven inhabited islands of Hawaii, Hawaiian was displaced by English and is no longer used as the daily language of communication. The one exception is Niʻihau, where Hawaiian has never been displaced, has never been endangered, and is still used almost exclusively. Efforts to revive the language have increased in recent decades. Hawaiian language immersion schools are now open to children whose families want to retain (or introduce) Hawaiian language into the next generation. The local National Public Radio station features a short segment titled "Hawaiian word of the day". Additionally, the Sunday editions of the Honolulu Star-Bulletin and its successor, the Honolulu Star-Advertiser, feature a brief article called Kauakūkalahale, written entirely in Hawaiian by a student.

Current revitalization efforts 
Language revitalization efforts are ongoing around the world. Revitalization teams are utilizing modern technologies to increase contact with indigenous languages and to record traditional knowledge.

Mexico 
In Mexico, the Mixtec people's language heavily revolves around the interaction between climate, nature, and what it means for their livelihood. UNESCO's LINKS (Local and Indigenous Knowledge) program recently underwent a project to create a glossary of Mixtec terms and phrases related to climate. UNESCO believes that the traditional knowledge of the Mixtec people via their deep connection with weather phenomena can provide insight on ways to address climate change. Their intention in creating the glossary is to "facilitate discussions between experts and the holders of traditional knowledge".

Canada 
In Canada, the Wapikoni Mobile project travels to indigenous communities and provides lessons in film making. Program leaders travel across Canada with mobile audiovisual production units, and aims to provide indigenous youth with a way to connect with their culture through a film topic of their choosing. The Wapikona project submits its films to events around the world as an attempt to spread knowledge of indigenous culture and language.

Chile 
Of the youth in Rapa Nui (Easter Island), ten percent learn their mother language. The rest of the community has adopted Spanish in order to communicate with the outside world and support its tourism industry. Through a collaboration between UNESCO and the Chilean Corporación Nacional de Desarrollo Indigena, the Department of Rapa Nui Language and Culture at the Lorenzo Baeza Vega School was created. Since 1990, the department has created primary education texts in the Rapa Nui language. In 2017, the Nid Rapa Nui, a non-governmental organization was also created with the goal of establishing a school that teaches courses entirely in Rapa Nui.

Health benefits of language revitalization 
Language revitalisation has been linked to increased health outcomes for Indigenous communities involved in reclaiming traditional language. Benefits range from improved mental health for community members, increasing connectedness to culture, identity, and a sense of wholeness. Indigenous languages are a core element in the formation of identity, providing pathways for cultural expression, agency, spiritual and ancestral connection. Connection to culture is considered to play an important role in childhood development, and is a UN convention right. Much has been written about the connection between identity and culture being inextricably intertwined in Indigenous cultures around the world. As colonisation and subsequent linguicide was carried out through policies such as those that created Australia’s Stolen Generation have damaged this connection, language revitalization may also play an important role in countering intergenerational trauma that has been caused.

One study in the Barngarla Community in South Australia has been looking holistically at the positive benefits of language reclamation, healing mental and emotional scars, and building connections to community and country that underpin wellness and wholeness. The study identified the Barngarla peoples connection to their language is a strong component of developing a strong cultural and personal identity; the people are as connected to language as they are to culture, and culture is key to their identity. Another study in New South Wales on the Warlpiri people echoes language as life, that the survival of the language is tied to the survival of the community. Language revival is closely linked to overcoming feelings of shame and fear, which have led to poor health outcomes in the past where speaking traditional language meant the possibility of being removed from family and community. Language reclamation is a form of empowerment and builds strong connections with community and wholeness.

Criticism 
John McWhorter has argued that programs to revive indigenous languages will almost never be very effective because of the practical difficulties involved. He also argues that the death of a language does not necessarily mean the death of a culture. Indigenous expression is still possible even when the original language has disappeared, as with Native American groups and as evidenced by the vitality of black American culture in the United States, among people who speak not Yoruba but English. He argues that language death is, ironically, a sign of hitherto isolated peoples migrating and sharing space: “To maintain distinct languages across generations happens only amidst unusually tenacious self-isolation—such as that of the Amish—or brutal segregation”.

Kenan Malik has also argued that it is "irrational" to try to preserve all the world's languages, as language death is natural and in many cases inevitable, even with intervention. He proposes that language death improves communication by ensuring more people speak the same language. This may benefit the economy and reduce conflict.

The protection of minority languages from extinction is often not a concern for speakers of the dominant language. There is often prejudice and deliberate persecution of minority languages, in order to appropriate the cultural and economic capital of minority groups. At other times governments deem that the cost of revitalization programs and creating linguistically diverse materials is too great to take on.

See also 
 :Category:Language activists
 Contemporary Latin
 Directorate of Language Planning and Implementation
 Endangered languages
 Language documentation
 Language nest
 Language planning
 Language policy
 Linguistic purism
 Minority language
 Regional language
 Rosetta Project
 Sacred language
 Second-language acquisition
 Treasure language
 Languages in censuses

Digital projects and repositories
Lingua Libre − a libre online tool used to record words and phrases of any language (thousands of recordings have already been done in endangered languages like Atikamekw, Occitan, Basque, Catalan, and are all available on Wikimedia Commons)
Tatoeba contains example sentences with translations in dozens of endangered languages, including Belarusian, Breton, Basque and Cornish.
The Living Archive of Aboriginal Languages  − contains works in endangered languages of the Northern Territory, Australia

Organizations
 Foundation for Endangered Languages
 The Language Conservancy
 Pūnana Leo, Hawaiian language schools
 Resource Network for Linguistic Diversity
 Culture Vannin, Manx Gaelic language organization
 SIL International

Lists
 Lists of endangered languages
 List of endangered languages with mobile apps
 Lists of extinct languages
 List of language regulators
 List of revived languages

References

Further reading 
 Grenoble, L. A. and Whaley, L. J. (1998). Endangered Languages: Language Loss and Community Response. Cambridge University Press.
 Nettle, D. and Romaine, S. (2000). Vanishing Voices. Oxford University Press.
 Reyhner, J. (ed.) (1999). Revitalizing indigenous languages. Flagstaff, AZ : Northern Arizona University, Center for Excellence in Education.
Bastardas-Boada, A. (2019). From language shift to language revitalization and sustainability. A complexity approach to linguistic ecology. Barcelona: Edicions de la Universitat de Barcelona.

External links

Organizations 
 First Languages Australia
 Enduring Voices Project, National Geographic
 Living Tongues Institute for Endangered Languages
 Hans Rausing Endangered Languages Project
 Google Endangered Languages Project
 Fourth International 3L Summer School
 Resource Network for Linguistic Diversity
 World Oral Literature Project, Voices of Vanishing Worlds

Canada

United States 
 Documenting Endangered Languages, Documenting Endangered Languages (DEL) (Archived program) National Science Foundation
 Society to Advance Indigenous Vernaculars of the United States, (Savius.org)
 Programs Concerned with Alaska Native Language (ANL) Revitalization

California 
 Advocates for Indigenous California Language Survival
 Indigenous Language Institute
 Live Your Language Alliance (LYLA) "It is the desire of the Live Your Language Alliance to hear and speak the traditional languages of the Tolowa, Karuk, Yurok, Hupa, Tsnungwe, Wiyot, Mattole, and Wailaki."

Technologies 
 Recording your elder/Native speaker, practical vocal recording tips for non-professionals
 Learning indigenous languages on Nintendo
 Texting endangered languages
 First Nations endangered languages chat applications
 DOBES Documentation of Endangered Languages

Techniques 
 
 Pointers on How to Learn Your Language (scroll to link on page)
 Do-it-yourself grammar and reading in your language, Breath of Life 2010 presentations
 Language Hunters
 Where Are Your Keys
 Lost Words - The Documentary, covers Dr. Stephen Greymorning's Accelerated Second Language Learning

 
Linguistic purism
Linguistic rights
Endangered languages